Mount Macoun is a  mountain summit located in Glacier National Park of British Columbia, Canada. It is part of the Selkirk Mountains range. Its nearest higher peak is Mount Fox,  to the southwest, and Mount Topham rises  to the south. The expansive Illecillewaet Névé lies to the northwest, and two small unnamed glaciers lie at the bottom of the steep east face. Precipitation runoff from the mountain drains into the Beaver River.

Climate
Based on the Köppen climate classification, Mount Macoun is located in a subarctic climate zone with cold, snowy winters, and mild summers. Winter temperatures can drop below −20 °C with wind chill factors below −30 °C. The months July through September offer the most favorable weather for viewing and climbing Mount Macoun.

History
 Mount Macoun was named in 1888 by mountaineers Reverend William S. Green and Rev. Henry Swanzy to honor John Macoun (1831-1920), a Canadian botanist and naturalist with the Geological Survey of Canada. The mountain's name was officially adopted September 8, 1932, by the Geographical Names Board of Canada. The first ascent of the peak was made in August 1902 by Rev. J. C. Herdman with guide Edouard Feuz, Sr.

See also

Geography of British Columbia

References

External links
 Weather: Mount Macoun
 Account of first ascent: Canadian Alpine Journal, page 104
 Flickr photo: Mount Macoun

Three-thousanders of British Columbia
Selkirk Mountains
Glacier National Park (Canada)
Columbia Country
Kootenay Land District